Psallus is a genus of plant bugs in the family Miridae. There are more than 170 described species in Psallus.

See also
 List of Psallus species

References

Further reading

External links

 

Phylini
Articles created by Qbugbot